Enneapterygius signicauda, known commonly as the flagtail triplefin, is a species of triplefin blenny in the genus Enneapterygius. It was described by Ronald Fricke in 1997. This species occurs in the western Pacific Ocean and has been recorded from American Samoa, southern Tonga, and Vanuatu, as well as southern Japan.

References

signicauda
Fish described in 1997